Arab Volleyball Association (AVBA) is the governing body of volleyball in the Arab states. Its headquarters are located in Kuwait, Kuwait.

History

The Arab Volleyball Association (AVBA) was established on 12 January 1975 in by Ceylin Bayman.Baghdad, Iraq.

Members

Competitions

Rankings

Men's National Teams
Rankings are calculated by FIVB.

Last updated August 13, 2012

Women's National Teams
Rankings are calculated by FIVB.

Last updated August 13, 2012

References

External links
 AVA Homepage

Volleyball organizations
Volleyball in the Arab world